In the context of U.S. competition law, the consumer welfare standard (CWS) or consumer welfare principle (CWP) is a legal doctrine used to determine the applicability of antitrust enforcement.

Under the consumer welfare standard, a corporate merger is deemed anti-competitive “only when it harms both allocative efficiency and raises the prices of goods above competitive levels or diminishes their quality". This contrasts with earlier frameworks of antitrust theory, and more recently the New Brandeis movement, which argue that corporate mergers inherently detrimental to consumers by way of diminishing competition. 

In other words, the consumer welfare standard does not analyze antitrust issues from a "big is bad" perspective that condemns corporate consolidation as a negative phenomenon in of itself. Instead, the framework stipulates that corporate consolidation is not necessarily harmful to consumers, as long as a merger (or series of mergers) does not lead to individuals having to pay more for a product or service.

Background and origins 
 

The roots of the consumer welfare standard can be found in the work of conservative legal scholar Robert Bork, most notably in his 1978 book The Antitrust Paradox. The consumer welfare standard gradually replaced the rule of reason principle as the dominant legal theory behind antitrust enforcement by the 1980s. 

The consumer welfare standard was influenced by microeconomic theory and is related to the economic theories of the Chicago school of economics. The adoption of the consumer welfare standard by courts and regulatory agencies has been credited with the sharp drop in antitrust enforcement in recent decades.

Criticism 
In the 21st century, antitrust advocates affiliated with the progressive "New Brandeis movement" have called into question the value of the consumer welfare standard. These critics argue that, by emerging as the dominant form of antitrust analysis by courts and regulators, the consumer welfare standard has led to less competition and an increase in the average market share of firms in a given sector. 

Many of these critics favor an approach to antitrust that views antitrust enforcement as a tool to promote of economic equality and labor rights. During the Biden Administration, multiple noted critics of the consumer welfare standard were appointed to federal office. These include Jonathan Kanter, Assistant Attorney General for the Department of Justice Antitrust Division, and Lina Khan, Chair of the Federal Trade Commission (FTC). 

Some conservatives, such as Jeff Landry of Louisiana, have also argued that the consumer welfare standard is insufficient, stating that he believes that "defining any corporate behavior that leads to lower prices for consumers as acceptable is not true to the original intent of antitrust legislation."

References 

 
Consumer protection law

Competition law
United States antitrust law
Conservatism in the United States